Charlestown is an unincorporated area in Peters Township, in Franklin County, in the U.S. state of Pennsylvania.

History
Charlestown had approximately 50 inhabitants in 1878.

References

Unincorporated communities in Franklin County, Pennsylvania
Unincorporated communities in Pennsylvania